Fan the Flame (Part 2): The Resurrection is an album by British band Dead or Alive, released in 2021. The songs were originally recorded in 1992 as a follow-up to Fan the Flame (Part 1) but cancelled prior to completion. The unreleased recordings were completed by producer Craig Hardy, following discussions with Pete Burns and Steve Coy prior to their deaths and with the help of Coy's estate.

The tracks "U Were Meant 4 Me" and "I Want 2 B with U" were re-worked for release on the band's 1995 album Nukleopatra, as "International Thing" and "Sleep with You" respectively. "Are U Ready 2 B Heartbroken" is a cover of the song of the same name by Lloyd Cole and the Commotions and "Extacy" is a cover of "It's Ecstasy When You Lay Down Next to Me" by Barry White.

Reception
Retro Pop Magazine gave the album three and a half stars out of five, noting that "some tracks hold up better than others".

Track listing
The 2CD deluxe edition contains an extra disc of instrumentals.

Personnel
Music – Pete Burns, Steve Coy
Producer – Steve Coy
Engineered, arranged, mixed & additional production – Craig Hardy
Art direction, design – Oink Creative
Executive producer, liner notes – Marina Zacco Coy
Mastered – Phil Kinrade
Photography – Paul Cox

References

2021 albums
Dead or Alive (band) albums